Walter, Knight Boeykens (January 6, 1938 – April 23, 2013) was a Belgian conductor and a world-renowned clarinetist. Boeykens' impressive discography, including several critically acclaimed performances, are testimony to his status as one of the most notable clarinetists of the 20th century. Boeykens remained active and was in concert frequently all around the world until his death in 2013.

His career as a clarinetist

Boeykens studied the clarinet at the Royal Conservatory of Music Brussels. In 1965 he won the International competition for contemporary music of Utrecht (Netherlands).

Between 1964 en 1984 he was principal clarinetist of Belgian Radio and Television (BRT)  Philharmonic Orchestra.

On December 20, 1968 he created Domaines by Pierre Boulez —originally written for Hans Deinzer— in the version for Clarinet and Orchestra with the BRT Philharmonic Orchestra under the direction of the composer himself.

This achievement launched him onto the path of a very successful career as a soloist. As a consequence, he was invited to many of the big European music festivals such as those of Berlin, Paris, Warschau, Salzburg, and last but not least to the festivals of Wallonia and Flanders (both in Belgium).

He appeared as soloist in numerous concerts in Israel, the USA, Venezuela, Japan, Korea...

Leaving the BRT philharmonic in 1984 allowed him to fully develop his career as a soloist, and play under the 'baton of famous conductors such as Charles Münch, Rafael Frühbeck de Burgos, Gary Bertini, Leonard Bernstein, James Conlon, and many others.

In 1969, Boeykens was appointed professor at the Royal Flemish Music Conservatory of Antwerp.

In 1972 he became professor at the "Académie Internationale d'Été de Nice". Additionally, Walter Boeykens holds assignments at the conservatories of Utrecht, Rotterdam and at the Fontys Conservatory in Tilburg all in the Netherlands. Last but not least, he teaches at the "Cité de la Musique" in Paris, France and at the "Scuola di Alto Perfezionamente Musicale" in Turin in Italy.

In 1981, he founded the Walter Boeykens Clarinet Choir at the Royal Flemish Music Conservatory of Antwerp.

In 1987 he was on the jury of the Jeunesses Musicales International Competition in Belgrade. The jury members were:
Milenko Stefanovic, Yugoslavia, President
James Campbell, Canada
Walter Boeykens, Belgium
Ludwig Kurkiewicz, Poland
Thea King, UK
Ernest Ackun, Yugoslavia
Marko Rudzak, Yugoslavia
Stjepan Rabuzin, Yugoslavia

In 1997 and 2001 he was on the jury of the Carl Nielsen International Music Competitions.
In 1997 the jury was composed of:

 Colin Bradbury President, UK
 Michel Arrignon France
 Walter Boeykens, Belgium
 Hans Deinzer Germany
 John Kruse Denmark
 Lee Morgan USA
 Charles Neidich USA
 Jens Schou Denmark
 Kjell-Inge Stevensson Sweden
 Niels Thomsen Denmark

In 2001, jury members were:

 Hans Deinzer Germany, President
 Michel Arrignon France
 Søren Birkelund Denmark
 Walter Boeykens Belgium
 Béla Kovács Hungary
 John Kruse Denmark
 Sabine Meyer Germany
 Charles Neidich USA
 Jens Schou Denmark
 Kjell-Inge Stevensson Sweden

On 23 April 2013 it was announced that Boeykens had died at the age of 75.

Prizes and honours

Boeykens has been awarded many honours and prizes:
1975 Grand Prix du disque
1988: The fifth "Prudens Van Duyse"-prize
1995: The "Speciale Cultuurprijs van de Gemeente Bornem"
Walter Boeykens is cultural ambassador of Flanders since 1995
In 1996 he received the Golden Medal of the Flemish government
In 1997 Walter Boeykens was knighted by King Albert II of Belgium in recognition of his lifetime achievement in music.
In 2007 he was awarded the title "Maestro Honoris Causa" at the "Hogeschool Antwerpen" by the "Antwerp Conservatory Foundation".

Discography

Biography on DVD

 EPR-CLASSIC EPRC 001 © 2007

Recordings on LP

 Cultura 5072-1 (p) 1975
 Elias Gistelinck; Shouts for Solo Clarinet;
 Alpha  DB 217 (p) 1976
 Wolfgang Amadeus Mozart; Clarinet Quintet in A-major, KV581
 Carl Maria von Weber; Clarinet Quintet op.34 in B-flat major
 The contemporary Clarinet; CBS 73840 (p) 1979
 Igor Stravinsky; Three Pieces for Clarinet Solo
 André Laporte; Reflections (Inner Space Music)
 Henri Pousseur; Madrigal I
 Elias Gistelinck; Shouts for Solo Clarinet
 Olivier Messiaen; Abime des oiseaux from "Quatuor pour la fin du temps"
 Pierre Boulez; Domaines
 Terpsichore 1982 021 (p) 1982
 Igor Stravinsky; Histoire du soldat
 Béla Bartók; Contrasts
 Musique Française pour clarinette et piano EMI 1A 065 64959 (p) 1982
 Camille Saint-Saëns; Sonata for Clarinet and Piano op.167
 Philippe Gaubert; Fantaisie
 Ernest Chausson; Andante et Allegro
 Gabriel Pierné; Canzonetta
 Henri Rabaud; Solo de Concours, op.10
 André Messager; Solo de Concours
 Claude Debussy; Première Rhapsodie pour Clarinette et Orchestre

Recordings on SACD

 Etcetera Records KTC5261 (p) 2003
 Wolfgang Amadeus Mozart;
 Clarinet Concerto in A, KV622
 Clarinet Quintet in A, KV581

Recordings on CD

As Soloist

 Arcobaleno SBCD-8400 (p) 1989
 Johannes Brahms; Quintet in B minor op.115
 Aurophon AU 34019 CD (p) 1992
 Georges Meister; Erwin, Fantasy for Clarinet and Symphonic Wind Band
 de Haske DHR 11.004-3 © (p) 1996
 Gioachino Rossini arr. Tohru Takahashi; Variations for Clarinet in a version with Military Band.
 de Haske DHR 16.011-3 © (p) 1998
 Henri Rabaud; Solo de Concours, op.10;
 Niels Wilhelm Gade; Fantasistykker, op.43
 Sir Malcolm Arnold; Sonata for Clarinet and Piano
 Leonard Bernstein; Sonata for Clarinet and Piano
 Robert Schumann; Fantasiestücke, op.73
 Gabriel Pierné; Canzonetta, op.19;
 Francis Poulenc; Sonate for Clarinet and Piano
 EPR-CLASSIC EPRC 002 © 2007,
 Jean Françaix; Concerto for Clarinet and Orchestra
 August Verbesselt; Concerto for Clarinet and Orchestra
 Marcel Poot; Clarinet Concerto
 EPR-CLASSIC EPRC 001 © 2007,
 Johannes Brahms; Quintet in B minor op.115
 Erato 2292-45459-2 © 1991, (p) 1991
 Carl Maria von Weber;
 Concerto in F major op.73 J114 for Clarinet and Orchestra;
 Concertino in c minor op.26 J109 for Clarinet and Orchestra;
 Concerto in E-flat major op.74 J118 for Clarinet and Orchestra;
 Harmonia Mundi HMC 901356 © 1991, (p) 1991
 Igor Stravinsky; Histoire du soldat;
 Béla Bartók; Contrasts;
 Alban Berg; 2nd movement from Kammerkonzert;
 Harmonia Mundi HMC 901371 (p) 1991
 Max Bruch; Eight Pieces op.83
 Alexander von Zemlinski; Trio in D minor op.3
 Harmonia Mundi HMC 901433
 Franz Krommer;
 Concerto for two clarinets and orchestra op.35 in E-flat major
 Concerto for clarinet and orchestra op.36 in E-flat major
 Franz Anton Hoffmeister;
 Concerto for two clarinets and Orchestra in E-flat major
 Harmonia Mundi HMC 901489 © 1994, (p) 1994
 Carl Nielsen; Concerto for Clarinet and Orchestra
 Harmonia Mundi HMC 905232 © 1996, (p) 1996
 Joan Albert Amargós; Concerto for Clarinet and Orchestra (1995)
 René Gailly International Productions CD87 075 © 1994, (p) 1994
 Nikolai Rimsky-Korsakov; Konzertstück in E-flat major for Clarinet and Military Band;
 René Gailly International Productions CD87 011 © 1986, (p) 1986
 André Laporte; Sequenza I for Solo Clarinet;
 Ricercar RIS 065044 (p) 1989  (Disque Choc in France)
 Johannes Brahms;
 Sonate F minor op 120/1
 Sonate E-flat major op 120/2
 Trio op.114 for Clarinet, Cello and Piano
 Talent DOM 29151 © 1998, (p) 1982
 Camille Saint-Saëns; Sonata for Clarinet and Piano op.167;
 Philippe Gaubert; Fantaisie;
 Ernest Chausson; Andante et Allegro;
 Gabriel Pierné; Canzonetta;
 Henri Rabaud; Solo de Concours, op.10;
 André Messager; Solo de Concours;
 Claude Debussy; Première Rhapsodie pour Clarinette et Orchestre;
 Talent DPM 291009 © 1987, (p) 1987
 Carl Maria von Weber;
 Clarinet Quintet in B-flat major op.34 J182;
 7 Variations on a theme from "Silvana" for CLarinet and Piano op.33 J128;
 Introduction, Theme and Variations for Clarinet and Strings op.posth;
 Grand Duo Concertant in E-flat major for Clarinet and Piano op.48 J204;
 Talent DPM 291008 © 1988, (p) 1988
 Carl Maria von Weber;
 Concertino in c minor op.26 J109 for Clarinet and Orchestra;
 Concerto in F major op.73 J114 for Clarinet and Orchestra;
 Concerto in E-flat major op.74 J118 for Clarinet and Orchestra;
 Vanguard Classics 99042 © 1995, (p) 1994
 Robert Groslot;
 Achaé, la docile amie for Clarinet and Orchestra;
 I Colli Senesi for Two Clarinets (with Anne Boeykens;
 The Tunnel for Clarinet and Piano;

Boeykens Clarinet Choir

 Vanguard Classics 99042 © 1995, (p) 1994
 Witold Lutosławski, arranged Robert Groslot; Dance Preludes for Clarinet Solo and Clarinet Choir;
 Robert Groslot; I Giardini della Villa d'Este for Voice and Clarinet Choir;
 René Gailly International Productions CD87 003 © 1987, (p) 1986
 Johann Sebastian Bach arranged Maarten Jense; Toccata and Fugue in D minor;
 Franz Schubert arranged Maarten Jense; Rosamunde Incidental Music, D797;
 Claude Debussy arranged Russel Howland; Petite Suite;
 Witold Lutosławski, arranged Robert Groslot; Dance Preludes for Clarinet Solo and Clarinet Choir;
 Norman Heim; Introduction and Concertante for Bass Clarinet and Clarinet Choir op.58;
 Jan L. Coeck; Clarifonia;

Live concert in Japan:
 Kosei Publishing Company KOCD-2502 © 1993 (p) 1993
 Gioachino Rossini arranged Harold G. Palmer; Overture from "L'italiana in Algeri";
 August de Boeck arranged Maarten Jense; Impromptu;
 Gioachino Rossini arranged Walter Boeykens; Introduction, Theme and Variations for Clarinet and Orchestra in E-flat major;
 Frits Celis; Incantations op.22;
 Jean "Toots" Thielemans arranged Eddy House; Bluesette;
 Franz Schubert arranged Maarten Jense; Rosamunde Incidental Music, D797;
 Peter Benoit arranged Johan De Doncker; Luim;
 Jan Van der Roost arranged Maarten Jense; Rikudim (Four Israeli Folk Dances);
 Johann Sebastian Bach arranged Maarten Jense; Toccata and Fugue in D minor;

Recordings of the Ensemble Walter Boeykens

Several recordings on the music label Harmonia Mundi.

Conducting a Symphonic Band

 Harmonieorkest St-Michael Thorn, Telstar TAR 19906 TL (p) 1978
 Alessandro Marcello arr. Leo Stratermans; Concerto for Oboe in C Major
 Nikolai Rimsky-Korsakov arr. Gerardo Lasilli; Flight of the Bumblebee
 Aram Khachaturian arr. Theo Adams; Lesghinka from the ballet Gayaneh
 Jules Massenet arr. Gerard Boedijn; Scenes Alsaciennes

Jazz Recordings

 CODA COD003 © 1994, (p) 1994
 The Other Side with Judy Niemack and Marc Matthys

Works written for him

 Raymond Chevreuille; Concerto
 Jan Coeck; Concerto
 Elias Gistelinck; Shouts
 Robert Groslot;
 Variations on a Theme by Paganini
 The Tunnel for Clarinet and Piano;
 André Laporte;
 Reflections (Inner Space Music);
 Sequenza I for Solo Clarinet;
 Marcel Poot; Concerto;
 August Verbesselt; Concerto
 Michael Hersch; Work for Clarinet and Cello; premiered at the Pantheon in Rome in 2001 as part of the RomaEuropa Festival.

References

 Pamela Weston; Clarinet Virtuosi of Today; pp. 32–37, Egon publishers 1989.
 EPR CLASSIC EPRC 001, 2007, Biography on DVD

External links
Official Walter Boeykens web-site

1938 births
2013 deaths
Belgian clarinetists
Belgian classical clarinetists
Members of the European Academy of Sciences and Arts
People from Bornem
20th-century classical musicians